Nano Mallian  is a village in Kapurthala district of Punjab State, India. The village is administrated by a Sarpanch who is an elected representative of village as per the constitution of India and Panchayati raj (India).

Demography 
According to the report published by Census India in 2011, Malian has 177 houses with the total population of 865 persons of which 433 are male and 432 females. Literacy rate of  Malian is 75.68%, lower than the state average of 75.84%.  The population of children in the age group 0–6 years is 88 which is 10.17% of the total population.  Child sex ratio is approximately 1146, higher than the state average of 846.

Population data

References

External links
 Kapurthala Villages List

Villages in Kapurthala district